The Cairo fire, also known as Black Saturday, was a series of riots that took place on 26 January 1952, marked by the burning and looting of some 750 buildings—retail shops, cafes, cinemas, hotels, restaurants, theatres, nightclubs, and the city's Casino Opera —in downtown Cairo. The direct trigger of the riots was the Battle of Ismailia when the attack on an Egyptian government building in the city of Ismaïlia by British Army troops the day prior, which killed 50 Egyptian auxiliary policemen. The spontaneous anti-British protests that followed these deaths were quickly seized upon by organized elements in the crowd, who burned and ransacked large sectors of Cairo amidst the unexplained absence of security forces. The fire is thought by some to have signalled the end of the Kingdom of Egypt. The perpetrators of the Cairo Fire remain unknown to this day, and the truth about this important event in modern Egyptian history has yet to be established. 

The disorder that befell Cairo during the 1952 fire has been compared to the chaos that followed the anti-government protests of 25 January 2011, which saw demonstrations take place amidst massive arson and looting, an inexplicable withdrawal of the police, and organized prison-breaking.

Background
In 1952, the British occupation of Egypt was entering its 70th year, but by then was limited to the Suez Canal zone. On the morning of 25 January 1952, Brigadier Kenneth Exham, the British commander in the region, issued a warning to Egyptian policemen in Ismaïlia, demanding that they surrender their weapons and leave the canal zone. By doing so, the British aimed to remove the only manifestation of Egyptian governmental authority in the canal zone. They also wanted to end the aid the police force was providing to anti-British fedayeen groups. The Ismailia Governorate refused the British request, a refusal that was reiterated by interior minister Fouad Serageddin. As a result, the Battle of Ismailia started, and 7,000 British Army troops equipped with machine guns, tanks and armour surrounded a government building and its barracks, containing nearly 700 Egyptian officers and soldiers. Armed only with rifles, the Egyptians refused to surrender their weapons. The British commander subsequently ordered his troops to attack the buildings. Vastly outnumbered, the Egyptians continued to fight until they ran out of ammunition. The confrontation, which lasted two hours, left 50 Egyptians dead and 80 others injured. The rest were taken captive.

Events
The following day, news of the attack in Ismaïlia reached Cairo, provoking the ire of Egyptians. The unrest began at Almaza Airport, when workers there refused to provide services to four British airplanes. It was followed by the rebellion of policemen in the Abbaseya barracks, who wished to express their solidarity with their dead and captured colleagues in Ismaïlia. Protesters then headed towards the university building, where they were joined by students. Together they marched towards the prime minister's office to demand that Egypt break its diplomatic relations with the United Kingdom and declare war on it. Abdul Fattah Hassan, the Minister of Social Affairs, told them that the Wafdist government wished to do so, but faced opposition from King Farouk I. As a result, protesters went to Abdeen Palace where they were joined by students from Al-Azhar. The crowd expressed its discontent towards the king, his supporters and the British.

The first act of arson took place in Opera Square, with the burning of Casino Opera entertainment club. The fire spread to Shepheard's Hotel, the Automobile Club, Barclays Bank, as well as other shops, corporate offices, movie theaters, hotels and banks. Fueled by anti-British and anti-Western sentiment, the mob concentrated on British property and establishments with foreign connections, as well as buildings popularly associated with Western influence. Nightclubs and other establishments frequented by King Farouk I were equally targeted. The fires also reached the neighbourhoods of Faggala, Daher, Citadel, as well as Tahrir Square and Cairo Train Station Square. Due to the prevailing chaos, theft and looting occurred, until the Egyptian Army arrived shortly before sunset and managed to restore order. The Army was alerted belatedly, after most of the damage had already occurred.

Damage
Most of the destruction, the extent of which was unforeseen by everyone, occurred between 12:30 pm and 11 pm. A total of £3.4 million damage was done to British and foreign property. Nearly 300 shops were destroyed, including some of Egypt's most famous department stores, such as Cicurel, Omar Effendi and the Salon Vert. The damage tally also included 30 corporate offices, 13 hotels (among which Shepheard's, Metropolitan and Victoria), 40 movie theaters (including Rivoli, Radio, Metro, Diana, and Miami), eight auto shows, 10 firearms shops, 73 coffeehouses and restaurants (including Groppi's), 92 bars and 16 social clubs. As for the human casualties, 26 people died and 552 suffered injuries such as burns and bone fractures. The dead included the 82-year old mathematician James Ireland Craig, who had devised the Craig retroazimuthal projection to enable Muslims to find the qibla, the direction to Mecca. Thousands of workers were displaced due to the destruction of these establishments.

Aftermath
The events were seen at the time as evidence of the Egyptian government's inability to maintain order. They almost led to an expansion of the size of the British occupation, although this outcome was averted by the Egyptian Army's restoration of order. Prime Minister Mustafa el-Nahhas initially presented his resignation, which was refused by King Farouk I. The Wafdist government of el-Nahhas and the king blamed each other for the failure to call in troops earlier. The Council of Ministers imposed martial law throughout the country, and ordered the closure of schools and universities. El-Nahhas was appointed military commander-in-chief, and proclaimed a curfew in Cairo and Giza from 6 pm to 6 am. He also issued an order banning public gatherings of five or more persons, with offenders facing imprisonment.

The king was holding a banquet at Abdeen Palace for nearly 2,000 military officers when the disturbances took place. The banquet had been organized to celebrate the birth of his son Ahmad Fuad. The following day, the king dismissed the Wafdist government, a decision which slightly eased tensions with the British. However, the series of short-lived cabinets he appointed afterward failed to restore public confidence in the monarchy. The resultant political and domestic instability throughout the ensuing six months was among the factors that paved the way for the Egyptian Revolution of 1952. The Cairo Fire pushed the Free Officers to advance the date of their planned coup, which took place on 23 July 1952. The coup resulted in the forced abdication of Farouk I and the abolition of the monarchy a year later. It also reignited anti-British hostilities, which led to the signing of the Anglo-Egyptian Evacuation Agreement of 1954. The last British soldier stationed in Egypt left the country on 18 June 1956.

Conspiracy theories
No one was arrested during the disorder. It appears that there were organized elements in the crowd, both left-wing and right-wing. According to official sources as well as eyewitnesses, the disturbances had been masterminded beforehand, and the groups responsible for it were highly skilled and trained. This was evidenced by the speed and precision with which the fires were ignited. The perpetrators held tools to force open closed doors, and used acetylene stoves to melt steel barriers placed on windows and doors. They executed their plan in record time through the use of nearly 30 cars. The timing was also another clear indication of the careful planning behind the arson. Saturday afternoon was chosen due to the weekend closure of offices and department stores, as well as the post-matinée closure of movie theaters.

Although some of the country's politicians may have been implicated in the initial outbreak of violence, it has never been fully determined who started the Cairo Fire. Historians still disagree about the identity of the initiators of the disturbances, leading to several conspiracy theories. Some believe King Farouk I masterminded the disorder to get rid of the government of el-Nahhas. Others support the theory that the British authorities instigated the fire to punish the administration of el-Nahhas for its unilateral abrogation of the Anglo-Egyptian Treaty in 1951. Alternative theories put the blame on the Muslim Brotherhood or the Egyptian Socialist Party, formerly known as Misr al-Fatat. Nevertheless, no material evidence has ever appeared to incriminate a specific group. Following the 23 July 1952 coup, an inquiry was opened to investigate the circumstances surrounding the Cairo Fire, but failed to identify the real perpetrators. The Cairo Fire thus remains an unsolved mystery.

See also
List of Black Saturdays
List of riots

References

Bibliography

Further reading
 Reynolds, Nancy Y. A City Consumed: Urban Commerce, the Cairo Fire, and the Politics of Decolonization in Egypt. Stanford, CA: Stanford University Press, 2012.

External links

1950s in Cairo
1952 murders in Egypt
1952 in Egypt
1952 protests
1952 riots
1952 fires in Africa
Anti-British sentiment
Arson in Africa
Downtown Cairo
Egypt–United Kingdom relations
Egyptian Revolution of 1952
Fires in Egypt
Fire
Mass murder in 1952
Political riots
Riots and civil disorder in Egypt
January 1952 events in Africa
1952 disasters in Egypt